This is the progression of world record improvements of the high jump W75 division of Masters athletics.

Key

References

Masters Athletics High Jump list

Masters athletics world record progressions